Mount Cameroon is an active volcano in the South West region of Cameroon next to the city of Buea near the Gulf of Guinea. Mount Cameroon is also known as Cameroon Mountain or Fako (the name of the higher of its two peaks) or by its indigenous name Mongo ma Ndemi ("Mountain of Greatness"). 

It is the highest point in sub-Saharan western and central Africa, the fourth-most prominent peak in Africa, and the 31st-most prominent in the world.
The mountain is part of the area of volcanic activity known as the Cameroon Volcanic Line, which also includes Lake Nyos, the site of a disaster in 1986. The most recent eruption occurred on February 3, 2012.

Description 
It rises from the coast through tropical rainforest to a bare summit, which is cold, windy, and occasionally dusted with snow. The massive steep-sided volcano of dominantly basaltic-to-trachybasaltic composition forms a volcanic horst constructed above a basement of Precambrian metamorphic rocks covered with Cretaceous to Quaternary sediments. More than 100 small cinder cones, often fissure-controlled parallel to the long axis of the massive  volcano, occur on the flanks and surrounding lowlands. A large satellitic peak, Etinde (also known as Little Mount Cameroon), is located on the southern flank near the coast.

Mount Cameroon has the most frequent eruptions of any West African volcano.  The first written account of volcanic activity could be the one from the Carthaginian Hanno the Navigator, who may have observed the mountain in the 5th century BC. Moderate explosive and effusive eruptions have occurred throughout history from both summit and flank vents. A 1922 eruption on the southwestern flank produced a lava flow that reached the Atlantic coast. A lava flow from a 1999 south-flank eruption stopped  from the sea, cutting the coastal highway.

Flora
The mountain's natural vegetation varies with elevation. The main plant communities on the mountain include:
 Lowland rain forest predominates on the lower slopes, from sea level to  elevation. The lowland forests are part of the Cross-Sanaga-Bioko coastal forests ecoregion. Many trees have buttress roots. The forests are diverse and species-rich, with numerous lianas. Much of the lowland forest has been converted to agriculture and agroforestry, including oil palm plantations. 
 Lower montane forest, also known as submontane forest or cloud forest, grows between  elevation. The lower montane forests are composed of evergreen trees, which form a  canopy that is either closed or discontinuous. There are scattered areas of meadow and scrubland, with grasses, herbs, tall herbaceous plants (including Acanthaceae), tree ferns, woody shrubs, and low trees. Frequent clouds and mists sustain profuse epiphytes, including mosses, ferns, and orchids. The lower montane forests are diverse and species-rich, with characteristic Afromontane plants and endemic species. Impatiens etindensis and I. grandisepala are herbaceous epiphytes endemic to the montane forests of Mount Cameroon. The lower montane forests, together with the higher-elevation forests, scrub, and grasslands, are part of the Mount Cameroon and Bioko montane forests ecoregion.
 Upper montane forest grows from  elevation. The upper montane forests are less species-rich than the lower-elevation forests, and fires are more frequent.
 Montane scrub grows between  elevation. Low trees of  form open-canopied forests, woodlands, and shrublands, with an understory of small shrubs, herbs, ferns, and climbers. 
 Montane grassland occurs between  elevation. The dominant vegetation is tussock grasses, with scattered fire-tolerant shrubs and low trees.
Frost-tolerant tussock grasses, dwarf trees and shrubs, and crustose, foliose, and fruticose lichens predominate.

Fauna and flora
Large mammals on the mountain include the African forest elephant (Loxodonta cyclotis), with a population of over 100 individuals. Other herbivores include red river hog (Potamochoerus porcus), bushbuck (Tragelaphus scriptus), bay duiker (Cephalophus dorsalis), blue duiker (Philantomba monticola), and yellow-backed duiker (Cephalophus sylvicultor). The mountain is home to several species of primates, including chimpanzee (Pan troglodytes), drill (Mandrillus leucophaeus), red-capped mangabey (Cercocebos torquatus), putty-nosed monkey (Cercopithecus nictitans), mona monkey (Cercopithecus mona), red-eared monkey (Cercopithecus erythrotis), Preuss’ guenon (Cercopithecus preussii), and crowned guenon (Cercopithecus pogonias).

Two species of birds are endemic to Mount Cameroon, Mount Cameroon spurfowl (Pternistis camerunensis) and Mount Cameroon speirops (Zosterops melanocephalus).

Flora

Mount Cameroon National Park
 Mount Cameroon National Park (Parc National du Mont Cameroun) was created in 2009. It covers an area of 581.23 km². The park includes the former Etinde Forest Reserve and most of the Bomboko Forest Reserve. A portion of the Bomboko Forest Reserve remains outside the park, on the lower northern slopes of the mountain.

IUGS geological heritage site
In respect of it being 'one of the few volcanoes in the world located at the ocean-continent boundary in a passive tectonic margin', the International Union of Geological Sciences (IUGS) included 'The Quaternary Cameroon Volcano' in its assemblage of 100 'geological heritage sites' around the world in a listing published in October 2022. The organisation defines an IUGS Geological Heritage Site as 'a key place with geological elements and/or processes of international scientific relevance, used as a reference, and/or with a substantial contribution to the development of geological sciences through history.'

Access 
The peak is frequently ascended by hikers. The annual Mount Cameroon Race of Hope scales the peak in around 4½ hours. Sarah Etonge has won the race seven times and is also a tour operator. English explorer Mary Kingsley, one of the first Europeans to scale the mountain, recounts her expedition in her 1897 memoir Travels in West Africa.

Gallery

See also
Debundscha 
List of volcanoes in Cameroon

Notes

References
 DeLancey, M. W. and M. D. DeLancey. (2000). Historical Dictionary of the Republic of Cameroon (3rd ed.). Lanham, Maryland: The Scarecrow Press.

External links
Mount Cameroon Research Foundation

 
Active volcanoes
Afromontane
Four-thousanders of Africa
Highest points of countries
Mountains of Cameroon
National parks of Cameroon
Southwest Region (Cameroon)
Holocene stratovolcanoes
Volcanoes of Cameroon
First 100 IUGS Geological Heritage Sites